Dima Wannous (born in Damascus in 1982) is a Syrian writer and translator. She studied French literature at Damascus University and the Sorbonne. Also, she studied translation in France and has lived in Beirut, where she worked for the newspapers Al-Hayat and As-Safir. She has also worked for broadcast media (radio and TV).

Life and career

She caught the eye of literary critics with Tafasil (Details), a short story collection released in 2007, which describes the Syrian society focussing on different characters with "ironic-grotesque overtones" and showing how they bow to power. She published her debut novel Kursi (The Chair) in 2008. She was named as one of the Beirut39, a group of 39 Arab writers under the age of 40 chosen through a contest organised by Banipal magazine and the Hay Festival. Her 2017 novel Kha'ifoun (The Frightened Ones), describes the life of a young woman in Damascus during the civil war who receives a manuscript by a former lover who fled to Germany. The book was shortlisted for the 2018 International Prize for Arabic Fiction, and has been translated into English, German, Dutch, Spanish, Turkish, and Norwegian.

Her narrative style has been described by critics as "sober and often painfully precise".

Dima is the daughter of Syrian playwright Saadallah Wannous. She is married to the Syrian journalist Ibrahim Hamidi and lives with him in London.

References

Syrian women novelists
Syrian novelists
Syrian women short story writers
Syrian short story writers
1982 births
Writers from Damascus
Living people
University of Paris alumni
20th-century novelists
20th-century women writers
20th-century translators
20th-century short story writers
Syrian Alawites
20th-century Syrian women writers
20th-century Syrian writers
21st-century Syrian women writers
21st-century Syrian writers